The 2019 Down Senior Football Championship was the 111th official edition of Down GAA's premier Gaelic Football tournament for senior clubs in County Down. 16 teams competed with the winner representing Down in the Ulster Senior Club Football Championship. The tournament operated a double elimination format for the opening two rounds of the championship, with the winners and early round losers rejoining at the quarter final stage.

Bredagh made their return to the senior grade after claiming the Down I.F.C. title in 2018. 

St. Mary's Burren were the holders after they ended Kilcoo's run of six titles in a row, defeating the then defending champions on a scoreline of 2-12 to 2-09 in the 2018 final. They were unable to defend their title however, as they were eliminated in the quarter final, losing to last year's finalists Kilcoo after a replay.

An Ríocht and Saval were relegated to the 2020 I.F.C. after finishing outside the top 15 ranked teams in the Down football leagues for 2018. They finished 5th and 8th (ranked 16th and 19th overall) in Division 2 respectively. Glenn John Martin's and Darragh Cross will replace them after they claimed the 2019 I.F.C. title and finished 4th (ranked 15th overall) in Division 2 respectively.

Team Changes
 

The following teams have changed division since the 2018 championship season.

To S.F.C.
Promoted from 2018 Down I.F.C.
 Bredagh  -  (I.F.C. Champions)

From S.F.C.
Relegated to 2019 Down I.F.C.
 Glenn John Martin's - (5th in Div. 2 F.L.; ranked 17th overall in Down F.L.)

Participating Teams
The following teams took part in the 2019 edition of the Down Senior Football Championship. –

  Ballyholland Harps (semi-final)
  Bryansford (Round 3)
  Burren (quarter-final)
  Castlewellan (Round 2B)
  Clonduff (semi-final)
  Kilcoo (champions) 
  Loughinisland (Round 3)
  Mayobridge (quarter-final)
  RGU Downpatrick (Round 2B)
  Rostrevor (Round 3)
  Warrenpoint (final)

  An Riocht (Round 2B)
  Bredagh (Round 3)
  Carryduff (quarter-final)
  Longstone (quarter-final)
  Saval (Round 2B)

Round 1
The 16 participating teams were placed into an open draw. Winning sides moved to Round 2A while losing sides went into Round 2B.

 Game was originally scheduled for 10 August, but was postponed due to adverse weather conditions. The game was moved to 12 August.

Round 2

Round 2A
Round 2A featured the eight winning sides from Round 1, with an open draw to determine the fixtures. The winning sides progress directly to the quarter final, with the losing sides moving into Round 3.

Round 2B
Round 2B saw the eight losing sides from Round 1 compete for a place in Round 3. The losing sides from this round were eliminated from the competition.

Round 3
Round 3 is a supplementary round for teams to have a second chance at reaching the quarter final. This round features teams that have lost once so far in this year's Championship, either winning in Round 1 and losing in Round 2A, or losing in Round 1 but winning their Round 2B fixture. Losing sides in this round are eliminated from this year's competition.

This round is seeded, meaning in each fixture a Round 2A losing side will face a Round 2B winning side.

Quarter-final
The quarter final sees the two brackets rejoin, with the earlier Round 2A winners facing a Round 3 winner for a Semi Final spot.

Semi-final
The semi final will see the four winning sides face off for a place in this year's final. This round is an open draw from the four Quarter Final winners.

Final
The final was played between the two Semi Final winners, and took place at Páirc Esler, Newry.

Warrenpoint booked their place in their first final in 41 years, while in stark contrast their opponents Kilcoo had qualified for their 8th consecutive final. The teams have met one time before in the final, that was back in 1948 where Warrenpoint won the second of their three previous titles.

References

External links
Down GAA

Down SFC
Down Senior Football Championship
Down Senior Football Championship